Lucy Payton (12 October 1877 in Kansas – 15 January 1969 in Louisiana, Missouri) was an American silent film actress.

Lucy married another actor, Claude Payton.

Filmography
 His Old-Fashioned Dad (1917) .... Nettie Wright
 The Yellow Bullet (1917) .... Teresa Fowler
 Pamela's Past (1916)
 Shadows and Sunshine (1916) .... Her Mother
 The Code of the Hills (1916)
 The Love Liar (1916) .... Margie Gay
 The Tenor (1915)
 The Secretary of Frivolous Affairs (1915) .... The Maid
 The Electric Alarm (1915) .... Mary's mother
 The Lure of the Mask (1915) .... Enrichetta
 The Last Concert (1915) .... Undetermined Role
 Was She Right in Forgiving Him? (1914)
 Pamela Congreve (1914)

External links
 

1877 births
1969 deaths
Actresses from Kansas
American silent film actresses
Burials at Forest Lawn Memorial Park (Glendale)
20th-century American actresses